Syncona is a large British closed-ended investment trust dedicated to life science investments. Co-founded as Syncona Partners in 2012 by current CEO Martin Murphy and the Wellcome Trust, before merging with the Battle Against Cancer Investment Trust ('BACIT') in December 2016 and listing publicly, the company is listed on the London Stock Exchange and is a constituent of the FTSE 250 Index. Its Chair is Melanie Gee.

References

External links
 Official site

Investment trusts of the United Kingdom
Companies listed on the London Stock Exchange